Macleaya, or plume poppy, is a genus of two or three species of flowering plants in the poppy family Papaveraceae, native to Japan (Macleaya cordata) and China (Macleaya miclocarpa).

Macleaya is named after the Scottish entomologist Alexander Macleay (1767-1848).

Cultivation
Both of the known species and the hybrid are cultivated as ornamental plants. The individual flowers are insignificant, but the combined effect of multiple stems four to six feet high can give a striking architectural effect. The plants are unsuitable for small gardens because of their invasive tendencies, but can be very effective as features in large gardens. They spread both by underground suckers and by seeding, so can be difficult to get rid of in some situations.

The cultivar M. × kewensis ‘Flamingo’ has gained the Royal Horticultural Society’s Award of Garden Merit.

Species and hybrids
 Macleaya cordata
 Macleaya microcarpa
 Macleaya × kewensis (Macleaya cordata × Macleaya microcarpa)

References

Papaveroideae
Papaveraceae genera